E. japonicum may refer to:
 Erythronium japonicum, the katakuri, a plant species native to Japan, Korea and northeastern China
 Eupatorium japonicum, a herbaceous plant species native to China, Japan and Korea

See also